is a Japanese footballer who plays as a defender for J2 League club Blaublitz Akita.

Career statistics

Club
.

Notes

References

2000 births
Living people
People from Miyazaki Prefecture
Association football people from Miyazaki Prefecture
Hannan University alumni
Japanese footballers
Association football defenders
J2 League players
Blaublitz Akita players